Churchill Lake is a glacial lake in the north-west part of the Canadian province of Saskatchewan.

Churchill Lake may also refer to:

 Churchill Lake 193A, an Indian reserve of the Birch Narrows Dene Nation in Saskatchewan, Canada
 Churchill Lake (Maine) and Churchill Lake Dam, in Piscataquis County, Maine, US
 Churchill Lake, an alternative name for Lake Kerr in Marion County, Florida, US